, provisionally known as 2001 KU76, is a trans-Neptunian object (TNO) that has a possible 6:11 resonance with Neptune.

It will come to perihelion around December 2021.

Assuming a generic TNO albedo of 0.09, it is about 211 km in diameter. The assumed diameter of this object makes it a possible dwarf planet.

Resonance
Simulations by Lykawka in 2007 show that  may be librating in the 11:6 resonance with Neptune. Buie classifies it as probably in resonance, although some possible orbits do not librate.  has a semi-major axis of 45 AU and an orbital period of about 302 years.

It has been observed 29 times over 6 years and has an orbit quality code of 4.

References

External links 
 

 

182294
Discoveries by Marc Buie
20010524